TP.3 Reloaded is the seventh studio album by American R&B singer R. Kelly. The album is the third installment in the 12 Play series. The album includes the first five parts of the song "Trapped in the Closet". The album became his fifth number 1 on the Billboard 200 album chart, and sold 1.52 million copies in the US.

Track listing 
All tracks produced by R. Kelly; except "Playa's Only" produced by Scott Storch, and "Burn It Up" produced by Luny Tunes and co-produced by R. Kelly.

Chart positions

Weekly charts

Year-end charts

Certifications

R. Kelly Live the Light It Up Tour

R. Kelly Live the Light It Up Tour is a live concert DVD, directed by Jim Swaffield, that was released right after the light it up tour in 2006. It was R. Kelly's first concert DVD he had released.

References

2005 albums
R. Kelly albums
Albums produced by Scott Storch
Albums produced by R. Kelly
Sequel albums
Trapped in the Closet
Albums produced by Luny Tunes
Albums produced by Nely